George Hill is one of the fourteen Districts of Anguilla.  Its population at the 2011 census was 879.

Demographics

References

Populated places in Anguilla